In geometry, Thales's theorem states that if A, B, and C are distinct points on a circle where the line  is a diameter, the angle ABC is a right angle. Thales's theorem is a special case of the inscribed angle theorem and is mentioned and proved as part of the 31st proposition in the third book of Euclid's Elements. It is generally attributed to Thales of Miletus, but it is sometimes attributed to Pythagoras.

History

There is nothing extant of the writing of Thales. Work done in ancient Greece tended to be attributed to men of wisdom without respect to all the individuals involved in any particular intellectual constructions; this is true of Pythagoras especially. Attribution did tend to occur at a later time. Reference to Thales was made by Proclus, and by Diogenes Laërtius documenting Pamphila's statement that Thales "was the first to inscribe in a circle a right-angle triangle".

Babylonian mathematicians knew this for special cases before Thales proved it. It is believed that Thales learned that an angle inscribed in a semicircle is a right angle during his travels to Babylon. The theorem is named after Thales because he was said by ancient sources to have been the first to prove the theorem, using his own results that the base angles of an isosceles triangle are equal, and that the sum of angles of a triangle is equal to a straight angle (180°).

Dante's Paradiso (canto 13, lines 101–102) refers to Thales's theorem in the course of a speech.

Proof

First proof
The following facts are used: the sum of the angles in a triangle is equal to 180° and the base angles of an isosceles triangle are equal.

Since  =  = , ∆OBA and ∆OBC are isosceles triangles, and by the equality of the base angles of an isosceles triangle, ∠OBC = ∠OCB and ∠OBA = ∠OAB.

Let α = ∠BAO and β = ∠OBC. The three internal angles of the ∆ABC triangle are α, (α + β), and β. Since the sum of the angles of a triangle is equal to 180°, we have

Q.E.D.

Second proof
Then B is a point on the unit circle .

and

Then we show that their product equals −1:

 

Note the use of the Pythagorean trigonometric identity .

Third proof

Let  be a triangle in a circle where  is a diameter in that circle. All angles in a rectangle are right angles.

Converse

For any triangle, and, in particular, any right triangle, there is exactly one circle containing all three vertices of the triangle. (Sketch of proof. The locus of points equidistant from two given points is a straight line that is called the perpendicular bisector of the line segment connecting the points. The perpendicular bisectors of any two sides of a triangle intersect in exactly one point. This point must be equidistant from the vertices of the triangle.) This circle is called the circumcircle of the triangle.

One way of formulating Thales's theorem is: if the center of a triangle's circumcircle lies on the triangle then the triangle is right, and the center of its circumcircle lies on its hypotenuse.

The converse of Thales's theorem is then: the center of the circumcircle of a right triangle lies on its hypotenuse. (Equivalently, a right triangle's hypotenuse is a diameter of its circumcircle.)

Proof of the converse using geometry

This proof consists of 'completing' the right triangle to form a rectangle and noticing that the center of that rectangle is equidistant from the vertices and so is the center of the circumscribing circle of the original triangle, it utilizes two facts:

adjacent angles in a parallelogram are supplementary (add to 180°) and,
the diagonals of a rectangle are equal and cross each other in their median point.

Let there be a right angle ∠ABC, r a line parallel to  passing by A and s a line parallel to  passing by C. Let D be the point of intersection of lines r and s (Note that it has not been proven that D lies on the circle)

The quadrilateral ABCD forms a parallelogram by construction (as opposite sides are parallel). Since in a parallelogram adjacent angles are supplementary (add to 180°) and ∠ABC is a right angle (90°) then angles ∠BAD, ∠BCD, and ∠ADC are also right (90°); consequently ABCD is a rectangle.

Then the point O, by the second fact above, is equidistant from A, B, and C. And so O is center of the circumscribing circle, and the hypotenuse of the triangle is a diameter of the circle.

Alternate proof of the converse using geometry
Let  be the center of Ω. Let  be the intersection of Ω and the ray . By Thales's theorem, ∠ is right. But then  must equal . (If  lies inside ∆, ∠ would be obtuse, and if  lies outside ∆, ∠ would be acute.)

Proof of the converse using linear algebra
This proof utilizes two facts:
two lines form a right angle if and only if the dot product of their directional vectors is zero, and
the square of the length of a vector is given by the dot product of the vector with itself.
Let M's center lie on the origin, for easier calculation.
Then we know
A = − C, because the circle centered at the origin has  as diameter, and
(A − B) · (B − C) = 0, because ∠ABC is a right angle.
It follows
0 = (A − B) · (B − C) = (A − B) · (B + A) = |A|2 − |B|2.

Hence:

|A| = |B|.

This means that A and B are equidistant from the origin, i.e. from the center of M. Since A lies on M, so does B, and the circle M is therefore the triangle's circumcircle.

The above calculations in fact establish that both directions of Thales's theorem are valid in any inner product space.

Generalizations and related results
Thales's theorem is a special case of the following theorem:
Given three points A, B and C on a circle with center O, the angle ∠AOC is twice as large as the angle ∠ABC.
See inscribed angle, the proof of this theorem is quite similar to the proof of Thales's theorem given above.

A related result to Thales's theorem is the following:

If  is a diameter of a circle, then:
If B is inside the circle, then ∠ABC > 90°
If B is on the circle, then ∠ABC = 90°
If B is outside the circle, then ∠ABC < 90°.

Application

Thales's theorem can be used to construct the tangent to a given circle that passes through a given point. In the figure at right, given circle k with centre O and the point P outside k, bisect OP at H and draw the circle of radius OH with centre H. OP is a diameter of this circle, so the triangles connecting OP to the points T and T′ where the circles intersect are both right triangles.

Thales's theorem can also be used to find the centre of a circle using an object with a right angle, such as a set square or rectangular sheet of paper larger than the circle. The angle is placed anywhere on its circumference (figure 1). The intersections of the two sides with the circumference define a diameter (figure 2). Repeating this with a different set of intersections yields another diameter (figure 3). The centre is at the intersection of the diameters.

See also
 Synthetic geometry
 Inverse Pythagorean theorem

Notes

References

External links
 
 Munching on Inscribed Angles
 Thales's theorem explained, with interactive animation
 Demos of Thales's theorem by Michael Schreiber, The Wolfram Demonstrations Project.

Euclidean plane geometry
Articles containing proofs
Theorems about right triangles
Theorems about triangles and circles

es:Teorema de Tales#Segundo teorema
he:משפט תאלס#המשפט השני